Psalm 130 is the 130th psalm of the Book of Psalms, one of the penitential psalms and one of 15 psalms that begin with the words "A song of ascents" (Shir Hama'alot). The first verse is a call to God in deep sorrow, from "out of the depths" or "out of the deep", as it is translated in the King James Version of the Bible and the Coverdale translation (used in the Book of Common Prayer) respectively. In Latin, it is known as De profundis.

In the slightly different numbering system used in the Greek Septuagint version of the Bible, and in the Latin Vulgate, this psalm is Psalm 129.

The New American Bible Revised Edition (2010) divides the psalm into two parts: verses 1-4 are a cry for mercy; verses 5-8 are a model expression of trust  in God.

The psalm forms a regular part of Jewish, Catholic, Lutheran, Anglican and other Protestant liturgies. It is paraphrased in hymns such as Martin Luther's "Aus tiefer Not schrei ich zu dir" in German. The psalm has often been set to music, by composers such as Orlando di Lasso and Heinrich Schütz. John Rutter set it in English as a movement of his Requiem.

Text

Hebrew Bible version
Following is the Hebrew text of Psalm 130:

A marginal note in the Masoretic Text tradition indicates that Psalm 130:2 is the middle of the whole Ketuvim (Book of Writings) section in Hebrew.

King James Version
 Out of the depths have I cried unto thee, O LORD.
 Lord, hear my voice: let thine ears be attentive to the voice of my supplications.
 If thou, LORD, shouldest mark iniquities, O Lord, who shall stand?
 But there is forgiveness with thee, that thou mayest be feared.
 I wait for the LORD, my soul doth wait, and in his word do I hope.
 My soul waiteth for the Lord more than they that watch for the morning: I say, more than they that watch for the morning.
 Let Israel hope in the LORD: for with the LORD there is mercy, and with him is plenteous redemption.
 And he shall redeem Israel from all his iniquities.

Liturgical usage

Judaism 

Psalm 130 is recited as part of the liturgy for the High Holidays, sung responsively before the open Torah ark during the morning service from Rosh Hashanah until Yom Kippur. The custom of reciting this psalm during these times had long lain dormant until it was revived in the Birnbaum and Artscroll siddurim in the 20th century.

Psalm 130 is one of the 15 Songs of Ascents recited after the Shabbat afternoon prayer in the period between Sukkot and Shabbat HaGadol (the Shabbat prior to Passover). In some congregations, it is said on every weekday. In Hebrew, it is often referred to as "Shir HaMa'alot MiMa'amakim" after its opening words.

It is recited during the Tashlikh prayer.

It is one of the psalms traditionally recited "in times of communal distress".

Verses 3-4 are part of the opening paragraph of the long Tachanun recited on Mondays and Thursdays.

Catholic Church

Ordinary use 
According to the Rule of Saint Benedict established around 530, the psalm was used at the beginning of the vespers service on Tuesday, followed by Psalm 131 (130).

Psalm 130 came to be associated with the seven penitential psalms which were recited after the hour of Lauds on Fridays in Lent in the medieval Christendom.

In the current Liturgy of the Hours, the psalm is recited or sung at vespers on the Saturday of the fourth week of the four-weekly cycle of liturgical prayers, and on Wednesday evenings. In the Liturgy of the Mass, Psalm 130 is read on the 10th Sunday of Ordinary Time in Year B, on the 5th Sunday of Lent in Year A, and on the Tuesday in the 27th Week in Ordinary Time on weekday cycle I. It is also used as the entrance antiphon on the 28th Sunday in Ordinary Time.

Bell prayer

Requiem Mass and the prayer for the dead 
The De Profundis bell is a slow, solemn and measured toll of the bell that marks the end of the day.

In 1610, Pope Paul V established the custom of ringing the De Profundis bell on All Saints' Day.

Pope Clement XII encouraged Christians through his brief Caelestes Ecclesiae thesauros promulgated on August 14, 1736, to pray daily for the souls in Purgatory inviting all to kneel at the first hour of nightfall and devoutly recite Psalm 130 with a Requiem aeternam at the end of it. Pope Pius VI by a rescript of Mach 18, 1781, granted an equal indulgence to those who should pray the De Profundis in any place where no bell for the dead is sounded. The Catholic tradition became that the De profundis and the versicle Requiem æternam were said after the evening Angelus.

Consecration of new bell 
According to the Rituale Romanum, the recitation of Psalm 130 accompanies the blessing of a new bell in a church or chapel, perhaps because the tolling of a church bell connotes a transition through death to life beyond.

Literature 

De Profundis was used as the title of a poem by Spanish author Federico García Lorca in Poema del cante jondo.

A long letter by Oscar Wilde, written to his former lover Lord Alfred Douglas near the end of Wilde's life while he was in prison, also bears the title "De Profundis", although it was given the title after Wilde's death. Poems by Alfred Tennyson, Elizabeth Barrett Browning, Charles Baudelaire, Christina Rossetti, C. S. Lewis, Georg Trakl, Dorothy Parker and José Cardoso Pires bear the same title.

In the novel Fires on the Plain by Shōhei Ōoka, the character Tamura makes reference to the psalm's first line "De profundis clamavi" in a dream sequence.

Musical settings
This psalm has frequently been set to music. It was sometimes used for funeral services, especially under its Latin incipit "De profundis":

Latin 

 Francesco Barsanti as part of his Sei Antifon
 Nicolaus Bruhns
 Marc Antoine Charpentier:
 De profundis H.156, for soloists, chorus and continuo (?1670s)
 De profundis H.189, for soloists, double chorus, flutes, strings and continuo (1683)  
De profundis à 4 voix H.211, for soloists, chorus and continuo (?early 1690)
De profundis H.212, for soloists, chorus and continuo (?early 1690s)
De profundis H.213 (?early 1690), H.213 a (1690s), for soloists, chorus and continuo
Court De profundis H.222, for soloists, chorus and continuo (?early 1690s)
 Mikalojus Konstantinas Čiurlionis: cantata
 Michel Richard Delalande: De profundis
Henry Desmarest: De profundis (before 1704)
 Josquin des Prez
 Jan Dismas Zelenka:
De Profundis ZWV 95, A minor, for soprano, alto, tenor, bass, violin, continuo ("violini et oboe colle voce ad libitum") (1728)
De Profundis ZWV 96, C minor, for tenor and bass soloists, chorus (SATB), strings and continuo (1727)
De Profundis ZWV 97, D minor, for alto, tenor and three bass soloists, chorus (SATB), two oboes, three trombones, strings and continuo (1724)
 Marcel Dupré
 Andrea Gabrieli, as part of his Psalmi Davidici
 Christoph Willibald Gluck
 Sofia Gubaidulina, De profundis

 Arthur Honegger, slow movement of Symphony No. 3
 Orlando di Lasso, as part of his Penitential Psalms
 Franz Liszt
 George Lloyd
 Leevi Madetoja  
 Felix Mendelssohn
Jean-Joseph Cassanéa de Mondonville (1748)
 Thomas Morley

 Vítězslav Novák
 Terry Oldfield
 Giovanni Pierluigi da Palestrina
 Arvo Pärt: De profundis
 Nicola Porpora
 Henry Purcell
 Joachim Raff: De Profundis, Opus 141, 8-part 
 Georg Reutter (once attributed to Mozart)
Pierre Robert
 Pedro Ruimonte
 Marc Sabat
 Antonio Salieri
 Johann Hermann Schein
 Arnold Schoenberg
 Heinrich Schütz
 Roger Sessions
 Jan Pieterszoon Sweelinck
 Virgil Thomson
 Vangelis
 Jan Dismas Zelenka, ZWV 50

Some other works named De profundis but with texts not derived from the psalm are:
 Frederic Rzewski based on the text of Oscar Wilde
 Dmitri Shostakovich, in his Fourteenth Symphony op. 135, to texts of Federico García Lorca translated to Russian

English

French

German

Other

Hymns 
Martin Luther paraphrased Psalm 130 as the hymn "Aus tiefer Not schrei ich zu dir" (Out of deep distress I cry to you), which has inspired several composers, including Bach (cantatas Aus der Tiefen rufe ich, Herr, zu dir, BWV 131 and Aus tiefer Not schrei ich zu dir, BWV 38), Mendelssohn and Reger.

Notes

References

Sources

External links

 Text of Psalms 126–131 from the 1662 Book of Common Prayer
 Text of Psalms 107–150 from the 1979 Episcopal Book of Common Prayer
 Nova Vulgata Online: Psalm 130
 
 
 Psalms Chapter 130 text in Hebrew and English, mechon-mamre.org
 Out of the depths I call to you, LORD; text and footnotes, usccb.org United States Conference of Catholic Bishops
 Psalm 130:1 introduction and text, biblestudytools.com
 Psalm 130 enduringword.com
 Psalm 130 / Refrain: My soul waits for the Lord. Church of England
Hymnary.org, Hymns for Psalm 130
 De Profundis – excerpted text of Wilde's De Profundis (1905 version?)
  – From the 1908 Catholic Encyclopedia, this short article talks about the hymn's origins and its Jewish and (pre Vatican II) Roman Catholic usage.
 
 

130